Hudi Kot is a dispersed settlement in the Pohorje Hills in the Municipality of Ribnica na Pohorju in northeastern Slovenia. The area is part of the traditional region of Styria. It is now included in the Carinthia Statistical Region.

The local church is dedicated to Saint Wolfgang and belongs to the parish of Ribnica na Pohorju. It dates to the early 16th century.

References

External links

Hudi Kot on Geopedia (map, aerial view)
Hudi Kot on Google Maps (map, photographs, street view)

Populated places in the Municipality of Ribnica na Pohorju